Glen Matthew Osborne (born 27 August 1971) is a New Zealand television presenter, former rugby union player and current Police Constable for the New Zealand Police.

Osborne was born in Wanganui and played representative rugby for Wanganui in the National Provincial Championship from 1990–1991, then for North Harbour from 1992. He represented the Waikato Chiefs in the Super 12 competition from 1996.

Osborne made his test debut for the All Blacks against Canada in 1995, scoring two tries, and was the All Blacks' first choice as full back during the 1995 Rugby World Cup, where he played in five of New Zealand's six matches. He continued to play internationally until 1999, playing 19 test matches plus two appearances as a replacement. His final test was a 1999 Rugby World Cup match against Italy, where he scored two tries. He scored a career total of 11 test tries.

Osborne is regularly making appearances on Māori Television, and is fluent in Te Reo Maori. He is filming a new television show Bring Your Boots, Oz where he is the presenter. Bring Your Boots, Oz is a heartland rugby series created by Julia Parnell with Dane Giraud, a celebration of rugby union and what it means to Māori.

In 2016, at the age of 44, Osborne graduated as a constable for the New Zealand Police.

In 2022, he revealed on season 2 of Match Fit that the professionalization of rugby coincided with his Super Rugby debut, which put his dreams of becoming a policeman on hold for 20 years. Health-wise: He looked fit, but he had high total blood cholesterol. Musically, however, both he and Charles Riechelmann can play the guitar. Osbourne turned the words from Ka Mate haka into a ballad. However: He and Piri Weepu, as fluent Maori speakers missed the powhiri and the song, then pulled out of the game against East Coast the next day with hamstring issues, but with injury toll mounting, he became an emergency backup as an unfamiliar spot as a flanker.

References

External links
 

1971 births
New Zealand international rugby union players
New Zealand police officers
Living people
Rugby union fullbacks
Expatriate rugby union players in Japan
New Zealand expatriate rugby union players
New Zealand expatriate sportspeople in Japan
North Harbour rugby union players
Chiefs (rugby union) players
Black Rams Tokyo players
Rugby union players from Whanganui